The 2003 Georgia Bulldogs football team represented the University of Georgia during the 2003 NCAA Division I-A football season. The Bulldogs completed the season with a 10–2 record.  The Bulldogs had a regular-season Southeastern Conference (SEC) record of 6–2, and won the SEC East for the second year in a row.  Georgia faced LSU in the SEC Championship Game, losing 13–34.  The Bulldogs completed their season with a victory over Purdue in the Capital One Bowl by a score of 34–27 in overtime.  In Mark Richt's third year as head coach, Georgia finished the season ranked 6th and 7th in the polls.

Schedule

Clemson

References

Georgia
Georgia Bulldogs football seasons
Citrus Bowl champion seasons
Georgia Bulldogs football